Incident management team (IMT) is a term used in the United States of America to refer to a group of trained personnel that responds to an emergency.  Although the incident management team concept was originally developed for wildfire response, it has been expended into what is now known as "All-Hazards Incident Management Team”.  An AHIMT can respond to a wide range of emergencies, including fires, floods, earthquakes, hurricanes, tornadoes, tsunami, riots, spilling of hazardous materials, and other natural or human-caused incidents.
In the United States, there are predominantly five types of incident management teams (IMTs).  An incident such as a wildland fire is initially managed by local fire departments or fire agencies, but if the fire becomes complex additional resources are called in to address the emergency, and higher levels of management training and capability are required.  IMTs are "typed" according to the size, scope and complexity of incidents they are capable of managing and are part of an incident command system.

To manage the logistical, fiscal, planning, operational, safety and community issues related to the incident/emergency, an Incident Management Team will provide the command and management infrastructure that is required.

Incident management starts as the smallest unit and escalates according to the size, scope and complexity of the emergency.  The five types of IMTs are as follows:
 Type 5: Local Village and Township Level – a "pool" of primarily fire officers from several neighboring departments trained to serve in Command and General Staff positions during the first 6–12 hours of an incident. 
 Type 4: City, County or Fire District Level – a designated team of fire, EMS, and possibly law enforcement officers from a larger and generally more populated area, typically within a single jurisdiction (city or county), activated when necessary to manage an incident during the first 6–12 hours and possibly transition to a Type 3 IMT. 
 Type 3: State or Metropolitan Area Level - comprising several entities within a state or DHS Urban Area Security Initiative (UASI) region, activated to support incident management at incidents that extend beyond one operational period. Type 3 IMTs will respond throughout the state or large portions of the state, depending upon State-specific laws, policies, and regulations.
 Type 2: National and State Level – a federally or state-certified team; has less training, staffing and experience than Type 1 IMTs, and is typically used on smaller scale national or state incidents. There are thirty-five Type 2 IMTs currently in existence, and operate through interagency cooperation of federal, state and local land and emergency management agencies.
 Type 1: National and State Level – a federally or state-certified team; is the most robust IMT with the most training and experience. Sixteen Type 1 IMTs are now in existence, and operate through interagency cooperation of federal, state and local land and emergency management agencies.

An incident management team consists of five subsystems as follows:
  Incident command system (ICS) – an on-scene structure of management-level positions suitable for managing any incident;
  Training – including needs identification, development, and delivery of training courses;
 Qualifications and certification – the United States has national standards for qualifications and certification for ICS positions;
 Publications management – the development, control, sourcing, and distribution of National Incident Management System (NIMS) publications provided by the National Wildfire Coordinating Group (NWCG); and
 Supporting technology and systems – technology and materials used to support an emergency response, such as Geographic Information Systems (GIS), orthophoto mapping, National Fire Danger Rating System, remote automatic weather stations, automatic lightning detection systems, infrared technology, and communications.

Sources
 Website – California Interagency National Incident Management Team #1 cited as of June 27, 2006
 Website – Washington Interagency Management Team #2 cited June 27, 2006
 Website – U.S. Fire Administration cited June 27, 2006

External links
 National Incident Management System Consortium

Incident management
Disaster preparedness in the United States
Firefighting in the United States